Riceford is an unincorporated community in Houston County, in the U.S. state of Minnesota.

History
A post office was established at Riceford in 1855, and remained in operation until it was discontinued in 1905. The community was named for Henry Mower Rice, a Minnesota Territory politician who forded Riceford Creek at this place in the 1850s.

References

Unincorporated communities in Houston County, Minnesota
Unincorporated communities in Minnesota